Vijaypal Baghel is an Indian environmental activist who saved more than one million trees. In 2020, India Post and Government of India honored him by issuing stamp on him. He is popularly known as "Green man of India".

References 

Year of birth missing (living people)
Living people
Indian environmentalists